A biofertilizer is a substance which contains living micro-organisms which, when applied to seeds, plant surfaces, or soil, colonize the rhizosphere or the interior of the plant and promotes growth by increasing the supply or availability of primary nutrients to the host plant. Biofertilizers add nutrients through the natural processes of nitrogen fixation, solubilizing phosphorus, and stimulating plant growth through the synthesis of growth-promoting substances. The micro-organisms in biofertilizers restore the soil's natural nutrient cycle and build soil organic matter. Through the use of biofertilizers, healthy plants can be grown, while enhancing the sustainability and the health of the soil. Biofertilizers can be expected to reduce the use of synthetic fertilizers and pesticides, but they are not yet able to replace their use. Since they play several roles, a preferred scientific term for such beneficial bacteria is "plant-growth promoting rhizobacteria" (PGPR).

Biofertilizers today 
Biofertilizers provide "eco-friendly" organic agro-input. Biofertilizers such as Rhizobium, Azotobacter, Azospirilium and blue green algae(BGA)  have been in use a long time. Rhizobium inoculant is used for leguminous crops. Azotobacter can be used with crops like wheat, maize, mustard, cotton, potato and other vegetable crops. Azospirillum inoculations are recommended mainly for sorghum, millets, maize, sugarcane and wheat. Blue green algae belonging to the general cyanobacteria genera, Nostoc, Anabaena, Tolypothrix and Aulosira, fix atmospheric nitrogen and are used as inoculations for paddy crop grown both under upland and low-land conditions. Anabaena in association with water fern Azolla contributes nitrogen up to 60 kg/ha/season and also enriches soils with organic matter. Seaweeds are rich in various types of mineral elements (potassium,    phosphorus, trace elements etc) hence they are extensively used as manure by people of coastal districts. Seaweed - manure also helps in breaking down clays. Fucus is used by Irish people as manure on a large scale.  In tropical countries bottom mud of dried up ponds which contain abundant blue green algae is regularly used as manure in fields. The mixture of seaweeds and blue green algae may serve as ideal fertilizer.

Phosphate-solubilizing bacteria 
Other types of bacteria, so-called phosphate-solubilizing bacteria, such as Pantoea agglomerans strain P5 or Pseudomonas putida strain P13, are able to solubilize the insoluble phosphate from organic and inorganic phosphate sources. In fact, due to immobilization of phosphate by mineral ions such as Fe, Al and Ca or organic acids, the rate of available phosphate (Pi) in soil is well below plant needs. In addition, chemical Pi fertilizers are also immobilized in the soil, immediately, so that less than 20 percent of added fertilizer is absorbed by plants. Therefore, reduction in Pi resources, on one hand, and environmental pollutions resulting from both production and applications of chemical Pi fertilizer, on the other hand, have already demanded the use of phosphate-solubilizing bacteria or phosphate biofertilizers.

Benefits
 Biofertilizers are means of fixing the nutrient availability in the soil. Generally Nitrogen deficiencies.
 Since a bio-fertilizer is technically living, it can symbiotically associate with plant roots. Involved microorganisms could readily and safely convert complex organic material into simple compounds, so that they are easily taken up by the plants. Microorganism function is in long duration, causing improvement of the soil fertility. It maintains the natural habitat of the soil. It increases crop yield by 20-30%, replaces chemical nitrogen and phosphorus by 30%, and stimulates plant growth. It can also provide protection against drought and some soil-borne diseases.
It has also been shown that to produce a larger quantity of crops, biofertilizers with the ability of nitrogen fixation and phosphorus solubilizing would lead to the greatest possible effect.
They advance shoot and root growth of many crops versus control groups. This can be important when implementing new seed growth.
Biofertilizers also promote healthy soil, leading to greater farming sustainability.

Groups of biofertilizers
Azolla-Anabena symbiosis: Azolla is a small, eukaryotic, aquatic fern having global distribution. Prokaryotic blue green algae Anabena azolla resides in its leaves as a symbiont. Azolla is an alternative nitrogen source. This association has gained wide interest because of its potential use as an alternative to chemical fertilizers.
Rhizobium: Symbiotic nitrogen fixation by Rhizobium with legumes contribute substantially to total nitrogen fixation. Rhizobium inoculation is a well-known agronomic practice to ensure adequate nitrogen.
Streptomyces grisoflavus
Unigrow (UniGrow): a commercial bio fertilizer that is currently in use. It is made with a by-product of palm oil production and it contains a microbial element It has been shown to have promising results in studies.

Areas in need of improvement 
Biofertilizers have been shown to have varying effects in different environments, and even within the same environment. This is something that many scientists have been working on, however there is no perfect solution at this time. They however, have been shown to have the most profound effects in drier climates. In the future, it is hoped that biofertilizers effects will be better controlled and regulated in all environments.

See also
 Bioeffector
 Endophyte
 Microbial inoculant
 Rhizobacteria
 Fertilizer
 Seaweed fertilizer

References

External links
 Primary bio-fertilizer microbes and their functions

Organic fertilizers